Abduct Me (French: Enlevez-moi) is a 1932 French comedy film directed by Léonce Perret and starring Jacqueline Francell, Roger Tréville and Arletty.

The film's art direction was by Guy de Gastyne.

Cast
Jacqueline Francell as Simone
Roger Tréville as René Dargelle
Arletty as Lulu
 as Edgar
Youcca Troubetzkov as Prince Aga
Félix Oudart as the beautiful Léon
 as witness
Gaston Jacquet as witness
Mado Bailly
Laura Bales
Willy Castello
Annette Doria
Jacques Ehrem
Andrée Lorraine

References

External links

1932 comedy films
French comedy films
Films directed by Léonce Perret
Films based on operettas
Pathé films
French black-and-white films
1930s French-language films
1930s French films